Richard Temple may refer to: 

People
Richard Temple (bass-baritone) (1847–1912),  English opera singer, actor and stage director
Sir Richard Temple, 1st Baronet (1826–1902), British colonial administrator and politician
Sir Richard Temple, 3rd Baronet (1634–1697), English politician
Sir Richard Carnac Temple (1850–1931), nineteenth-century writer on India and Burma
Richard Temple, 1st Viscount Cobham (1675–1749), British soldier and politician
Richard Temple (MP) (c.1726–1749), MP for Downton
Novels
Richard Temple (novel), a novel by Patrick O'Brian

Temple, Richard